Over the Rainbow (stylized as "OVER THE RAINBOW") is the tenth studio album by Japanese singer and songwriter Mai Kuraki. It was released on January 11, 2012, by Northern Music. Some of the songs on Over the Rainbow are themed about the 2011 Tōhoku earthquake and tsunami, from which Kuraki has continuously contributed to the reconstruction in several ways.

In Japan, the album debuted at number two on the Oricon Weekly Albums chart, selling 29,618 copies in its first week, and spent 11 weeks on the chart. In Taiwan, Over the Rainbow debuted at number fourteen on the G-Music chart. As of October 2018, it is estimated that the album has sold 49,998 copies in Japan alone.

The first single from Over the Rainbow, "1000 Mankai no Kiss" was released in March 2011, the song peaked at number four on the Oricon Weekly Singles chart, and successfully reached number fourteen in Taiwan. The follow-up single, "Mō Ichido" achieved a moderate success, reaching number seven in Japan. The third single from the album, "Your Best Friend" was released in October 2011 and served as the theme song to the Japanese animated television series Case Closed. The fourth single "Strong Heart" was released on DVD single format. The song themed about female empowerment served as the theme song to the Japanese television series Hunter. The part of profits gained from the released of the single was donated to support the reconstruction from the 2011 Tōhoku earthquake and tsunami. To support the album, she embarked on the concert tour Mai Kuraki Live Tour 2012: Over the Rainbow from January 21, 2012.

Release and promotion

Singles 
"1000 Mankai no Kiss" was released as the lead single from the album in March 2011. A J-pop ballad song written by Kuraki herself and Aika Ohno, "1000 Mankai no Kiss" served as the television commercial song to Kosé's Esprique Precious brand. The song peaked at number four on the Oricon Weekly Singles chart, and successfully reached number fourteen in Taiwan. "1000 Mankai no Kiss" has sold 25,013 copies in Japan alone.

"Mō Ichido" was released in May 2011 as the second single from the album. The song served as the Japanese television drama series Kiri ni Sumu Akuma and peaked at number seven in Japan. As of October 2018, the song has sold 23,430 copies in Japan.

The third single from the album, "Your Best Friend" was released in October 2011. The song served as the theme song to the Japanese animated television series Case Closed and reached number six in Japan. The song has sold 25,247 copies in Japan alone, becoming the best-selling song on the album.

The fourth single "Strong Heart" was released on DVD single format. The song themed about female empowerment served as the theme song to the Japanese television series Hunter. The part of profits gained from the released of the single was donated to support the reconstruction from the 2011 Tōhoku earthquake and tsunami.

Other songs 
"Sayonara wa Madaiwanai de" was released in March 2011, as the B-side track of "1000 Mankai no Kiss". The song was rearranged for the album.
"Step by Step" was released as the B-side track of "Your Best Friend" in October 2011. The song served as the television commercial song to Nemu Resort in Mie "Stay the Same" served as the Sanrio's image song for Wish Me Mell, where the new character, Maimai was named after Kuraki. "Brave Your Heart", which features a Chinese actor Alex Ru served as the theme song to the Japanese drama movie Ashita ni Kakeru Hashi.

Critical reception

The album received positive critical reception from different sites. EmbraceYou, a web magazine (webzine) based in New York City, stated that "every track (in this album) sells in its own unique way." FM 139.7, a blogsite dedicated to East Asian pop culture, described Over the Rainbow as "the final stage of Kuraki's evolution from R&B to J-pop, while maintaining some of her earlier youthful R&B momentum."

Track listing

Charts

Daily charts

Weekly charts

Monthly charts

Release history

References

External links
 
 Over the Rainbow (Mai Kuraki album) on Oricon

2012 albums
Mai Kuraki albums
Being Inc. albums
Japanese-language albums
Albums produced by Daiko Nagato